The Espérance Club, and the Maison Espérance dressmaking cooperative, were founded in the mid-1890s by Emmeline Pethick-Lawrence and Mary Neal in response to distressing conditions for girls in the London dress trade.  The club was based at 50 Cumberland Market, in the St Pancras area of London.

Mary Neal had become fascinated by the folk songs and dances being collected by Cecil Sharp, and invited some traditional dancers to teach morris dancing to the young women of the Espérance Club. Thus was born the Espérance Morris, which inspired a modern London women's side, New Esperance Morris.

After donating a £1,000 legacy to the club and meeting Emmeline Pethick-Lawrence, Lady Constance Lytton was enthused by the women's movement and thus became a leading suffragette activist.

References

External links

New Esperance Morris London based women's side continuing the tradition of Mary Neal
Photograph of the Espérance Morris Dancers, ca. 1900 at New Esperance Morris

Defunct clubs and societies of the United Kingdom
English folk dance